GMIT may refer to several educational institutions:

 Galway-Mayo Institute of Technology, Ireland 
 G M Institute of Technology, Davangere, Karnataka, India
 Gargi Memorial Institute of Technology, Kolkata, West Bengal, India
 German-Mongolian Institute for Resources and Technology, Ulaanbaatar, Mongolia